Giorgi Jgerenaia (born 28 December 1993) is a Georgian football player. He plays for Saburtalo Tbilisi.

Club career
He made his Ukrainian First League debut for Mykolaiv on 14 July 2013 in a game against Zirka Kirovohrad.

References

External links
 
 
 

1993 births
Footballers from Tbilisi
Living people
Footballers from Georgia (country)
Association football defenders
Georgia (country) youth international footballers
Georgia (country) under-21 international footballers
FC Gagra players
FC Samtredia players
FC Mariupol players
MFC Mykolaiv players
FC Dynamo-2 Kyiv players
FC Saburtalo Tbilisi players
Erovnuli Liga players
Ukrainian First League players
Expatriate footballers from Georgia (country)
Expatriate sportspeople from Georgia (country) in Ukraine
Expatriate footballers in Ukraine